The 1948 All-Pacific Coast football team consists of American football players chosen by various organizations for All-Pacific Coast teams for the 1948 college football season. The organizations selecting these teams included the conference coaches, the Associated Press (AP), and the United Press (UP).

All-Pacific Coast selections

Quarterback
 Norm Van Brocklin, Oregon (Coaches-1; AP-1; UP-1) (College and Pro Football Halls of Fame)

Halfbacks
 Jack Swaner, California (Coaches-1; AP-1; UP-1)
 Don Doll, UCLA (AP-1; UP-1)
 Jerry Williams, Washington State (Coaches-1)

Fullback
 Jackie Jensen, California (Coaches-1; AP-1; UP-1)

Ends
 Dick Wilkins, Oregon (AP-1; UP-1)
 Dan Garza, Oregon (Coaches-1)
 Bud Van Deren, California (Coaches-1; UP-1)
 Ellery Williams, Santa Clara (AP-1)

Tackles
 Lauri Niemi, Washington State (Coaches-1; AP-1; UP-1)
 Jim Turner, California (Coaches-1; AP-1)
 Austin, Oregon (UP-1)

Guards
 Rod Franz, California (Coaches-1; AP-1) (College Football Hall of Fame)
 Alf Hemstead, Washington (Coaches-1; AP-1)
 Bob Levenhagen, Washington (UP-1)
 Baker, California (UP-1)

Centers
 Brad Ecklund, Oregon (Coaches-1 [center/linebacker]; AP-1; UP-1)

Key

Coaches = selected by the conference coaches and announced by Pacific Coast Conference Commissioner

AP = Associated Press, "named by sports writer and football coaches from all parts of the far west"

UP = United Press: "All selections were made through the co-operation of sports writers, the athletic departments of each school in the conference and coaches and their assistants"

Bold = Consensus first-team selection of the coaches, AP and UP

See also
1948 College Football All-America Team

References

All-Pacific Coast Football Team
All-Pacific Coast football teams
All-Pac-12 Conference football teams